Neoparaphytoseius is a genus of mites in the Phytoseiidae family.

Species
 Neoparaphytoseius sooretamus (El-Banhawy, 1984)

References

Phytoseiidae